The 1975 CECAFA Cup was the third edition of the tournament. It was held in Zambia, and was won by Kenya. The matches were played between October 31 and November 9.

Group A

Group B

Semi-finals

Final

References
RSSSF info

CECAFA Cup
CECAFA
1975 in Zambia